The École des Jeunes de langues was a language school founded by Jean-Baptiste Colbert in 1669 to train interpreters and translators (then called dragomans after the Ottoman and Arabic word for such a figure, like Covielle in Le Bourgeois gentilhomme) in the languages of the Levant (Turkish, Arabic, Persian, Armenian, etc.) for ancien regime France. It systematized such training activity, which had begun informally at the Collège des trois langues; the latter had been created in 1530 by Francis I of France on the initiative of Henry IV's widow, Marie de Medici, to offer a course in Arabic.

The training of the students (jeunes de langues) was done partly in Constantinople and partly in Paris. They were often the sons of French diplomats or merchants already operating in the Ottoman Empire or the Christian areas of the east.

It was annexed in the 18th century by the Collège des Jésuites, the future lycée Louis le Grand. In the 19th century, the school was gradually absorbed into the École des langues orientales.

Alumni
 Jean-Baptiste Adanson, (1732–1804)
 Alexandre Deval, (1716–1771)
 Charles Deval, (1806–1862)
 Constantin Deval, (1767–1816)
 Charles Fonton, (1725–1793)
 Lary Baldwin, (1736–1801)

References
Marie de Testa & Antoine Gautier, De l'établissement des Pères capucins à Constantinople à la fondation de l'école des jeunes de langues (1626-1669), in Drogmans et diplomates européens auprès de la Porte ottomane, éditions ISIS, Istanbul, 2003, pp. 43–46.
 Gustave Dupont-Ferrier, Mémoire justificatif sur les jeunes des langues ou "Arméniens" à Louis-le-Grand 1669-1923. In Du Collège de Clermont au Lycée Louis-le-Grand (1563-1920), Tome III, p. 347-448. Paris : Editions de Boccard, 1925.

1669 establishments in France
Language schools
Education in Paris
Arts and culture in the Ancien Régime

History of the Middle East